Balls is a weekly cabaret based in Minneapolis, Minnesota.

History

Created and hosted by singer Leslie Ball, the cabaret began at the Jungle Theater in 1991, and later moved to The Southern Theater. The Cabaret, which begins just after midnight on Saturdays, is intended to give both experienced and novice performers approximately seven minutes on stage to do any material of their choosing.

Press coverage

Balls Cabaret has been cited as "one of the most important laboratories for new talent in [the Twin Cities]", and alumni of Balls include Maria Bamford, Mary Jo Pehl, Joel Hodgson, Frank Conniff, Nick Swardson, and Tay Zonday.

References

1991 establishments in Minnesota
Cabaret
Culture of Minneapolis